Pink SI was a Slovenian television station owned by the Serbian media company, Pink. After January 2017, it was owned by PRO TV d.o.o.

The channel changed its name to Pink 3 in March 2012. In September of the same year, the channel rebranded as TV3 Medias. In December 2017 it was renamed to TV3 Slovenija, due to new owners politics.

References

Defunct television channels in Slovenia
Television channels and stations established in 2010
Television channels and stations disestablished in 2012

sl:TV3 Slovenija